Nashville is the fifth album by indie folk musician Josh Rouse.  It was released in 2005 by Rykodisc.

Track listing
 "It's the Nighttime" (Josh Rouse, Daniel Tashian) — 4:04
 "Winter in the Hamptons" (Rouse, Tashian) — 3:08
 "Streetlights" (Rouse) — 4:24
 "Carolina" (Rouse) — 3:31
 "Middle School Frown" (Rouse) — 3:24
 "My Love Has Gone" (Rouse) — 4:19
 "Saturday" (Rouse) — 4:22
 "Sad Eyes" (Rouse, Sean Kelly) — 4:49
 "Why Won't You Tell Me What" (Rouse) — 3:50
 "Life" (Rouse, Tashian) — 3:47

References

Josh Rouse albums
2005 albums